Jay Shendure is an American scientist and human geneticist at the University of Washington. He is a professor in the Department of Genome Sciences at the University of Washington School of Medicine and an Affiliate Investigator in the Human Biology Division at the Fred Hutchinson Cancer Research Center.
Shendure's research is focused on developing and applying new technologies in genomics. In 2005, his doctoral research with George M. Church resulted one of the first successful proof-of-concepts of next-generation DNA sequencing. Shendure's research group at the University of Washington pioneered exome sequencing and its application to Mendelian disorders, a strategy that has been applied to identify hundreds of disease-causing genes. Other notable accomplishments of Shendure's laboratory include the first whole genome sequencing of a human fetus using samples obtained non-invasively from the parents, and the sequencing of the HeLa genome in agreement with Henrietta Lacks’ family.

Shendure graduated summa cum laude from Princeton University in 1996 and completed a Fulbright scholarship at Pune, India, in 1997. He then entered the Medical Scientist Training Program at Harvard Medical School and received his Ph.D. in 2005 and his M.D. in 2007. He joined the faculty at the Department of Genome Sciences at the University of Washington in 2007 and was tenured as an associate professor four years later in 2011.

Shendure is a 2006 recipient of the TR35 Young Innovator Award from MIT Technology Review, the Curt Stern Award from the American Society of Human Genetics in 2012, the FederaPrijs from the Federation of Dutch Medical Scientific Societies in 2013, a National Institutes of Health Director's Pioneer Award in 2013, and a Howard Hughes Medical Investigator Award.  He is also the founding Scientific Director of the Brotman-Baty Institute established in 2017 through a gift from Jeffrey H. and Susan Brotman, and Daniel R. and Pamela L. Baty.

References

Year of birth missing (living people)
Living people
American geneticists
Harvard Medical School alumni
Princeton University alumni
Richard-Lounsbery Award laureates